Joan Rosenbaum (born in Hartford, Connecticut) is an American curator and was the director of the Jewish Museum from 1981 until September 2011 when she retired. Rosenbaum is a speaker and panelist on art and Jewish culture related subjects. She also wrote and published articles for the Jewish Museum as well as other institutions.

Early years 
Rosenbaum was born in Hartford, Connecticut to Jewish parents. She attended Boston University and Hunter College, studying art history and received a certificate in non-profit management from Columbia University.

Career 
Early on in her museum career, Rosenbaum worked as a curatorial assistant in drawing and prints at the Museum of Modern Art (1965–72). From 1972 until 1979, she was the director of the museum program at the New York State Council on the Arts. Rosenbaum then worked one year as a consultant at the Michael Washburn firm before becoming the director of the Jewish Museum in 1981.

Some of the exhibitions the Jewish Museum showed during her tenure as director are: The Dreyfus Affair: Art, Truth, and Justice; Gardens and Ghettos: The Art of Jewish Life in Italy; The Circle of Montparnasse: Jewish Artists in Paris, 1905-1945; New York: Capital of Photography; The Power of Conversation: Jewish Women and Their Salons; Too Jewish? Challenging Traditional Identities; Action/Abstraction: Pollock, de Kooning and American Art, 1940-1976; Schoenberg, Kandinsky, and the Blue Rider; Houdini: Art and Magic; and exhibitions on individual artists such as Man Ray, Anni Albers, Marc Chagall, Chaïm Soutine, Amedeo Modigliani, Camille Pissarro, Louise Nevelson, Sarah Bernhardt, and Eva Hesse.

During her time at the Jewish Museum, Rosenbaum managed to increase the museum’s attendance by a third, the museum’s collection grew to 26,000 objects and the annual budget increased from $1 million in 1981 to $15 million. In addition, from 1990 until 1993, Rosenbaum led the project to renovate and expand the museum’s building, doubling it in size as well as leading the museum’s first major capital campaign, of $60 million.

In 1984 she was a member of the lobbying coalition, that lobbied for an $11 million/ 28 percent  increase in annual state aid to the arts.

Other roles 
In 2000, Rosenbaum was a creative time board member of Creative Time and Artists Space: Anchorage 2000 as well as in 2004, for the Creative Time and Artists Space: Red Velvet Committee and in 2005, she was on the glow committee of the Creative Time and Artists Space: Committee Content.

Rosenbaum has honorary doctorates from the Knighthood of the Order of the Dannebrog from Denmark (1983), the Chevalier for Arts and Letters from the Cultural Ministry of France (1999) and the Jewish Theological Seminary of America (2003). She has served several years as an active member of the Association of Art Museum Directors (AAMD) and the Council of American Jewish Museums (CAJM). She is also on the board of Artis, an independent nonprofit organization that supports contemporary artists from Israel.

Rosenbaum is a speaker and panelist on art and Jewish culture related subjects. She wrote and published articles for the Jewish Museum as well as other institutions.

Publications 

 1982: J. James Tissot: Biblical Paintings, The Jewish Museum, ASIN B00IZOCGT6
1983: Celebrating Rites of Passage: Judaic Treasures From The Jewish Museum, The Jewish Museum, ASIN B002ABI662
2004: Masterworks of The Jewish Museum, The Jewish Museum,

References 

Living people
Directors of museums in the United States
Women museum directors
People from Hartford, Connecticut
Year of birth missing (living people)